National Secondary Route 108, or just Route 108 (or ) is a National Road Route of Costa Rica, located in the San José province.

Description
In San José province the route covers San José canton (Merced, Uruca districts), Goicoechea canton (Guadalupe, San Francisco districts), Tibás canton (Cinco Esquinas district).

References

Highways in Costa Rica